Wilkeson can refer to:

 Frank Wilkeson, American journalist and explorer
 Wilkeson, Washington a town in the US named for his father
 Leon Wilkeson, the bass guitarist of the band Lynyrd Skynyrd